Clarence Horatio Pitkin (August 26, 1849 – May 31, 1901) was a Vermont attorney and businessman.  He served for two years as United States attorney for the District of Vermont.

Early life
Clarence Horatio Pitkin was born in East Montpelier, Vermont, on August 26, 1849, the son of Perley P. Pitkin and Caroline Matilda (Templeton) Pitkin.  Pikin's father was a prominent Montpelier businessman and banker, served as a Union Army officer during the American Civil War, and later attained the rank of brigadier general as quartermaster of the Vermont Militia.  Clarence Pitkin was educated in Montpelier, and attended Amherst College.  Deciding on a legal career, he studied law with Benjamin F. Fifield of Montpelier, and attained admission to the bar in 1872.

Start of career
Pitkin practiced in Montpelier as the partner of Fifield and Charles W. Porter, and continued with Pitkin after Fifield's retirement.  Pitkin later practiced in partnership with Hiram A. Huse, who had studied law in his office.  Among the other prospective attorneys who studied under Pitkin was John H. Senter.

A Republican, from 1880 to 1882, Pitkin served as State's Attorney of Washington County.  In 1881, he was one of the commissioners appointed to revise the state statutes.

In 1887, Pitkin succeeded Kittredge Haskins as United States attorney for the District of Vermont.  He served until 1890, and was succeeded by Frank Plumley.

Later career
The Pitkin family's business interests included the Lane Manufacturing Company, of which Perley P. Pitkin became president in 1888.  As the company expanded, it required more involvement from the family members involved in its management, including Clarence Pitkin.  He became the company's secretary, and soon after resigning as U.S. attorney he gave up the practice of law to devote his full attention to Lane Manufacturing.

Death and burial
Pitkin continued to serve as secretary of Lane Manufacturing, and resided on a farm near Montpelier Junction in the town of Berlin.  His health began to decline in early 1901, and he died at his Montpelier Junction home on May 31, 1901.  Pitkin was buried at Green Mount Cemetery in Montpelier.

Family
In 1884, Pitkin married Catherine (or Katherine) Lamora (or Lamery) (1855–1924).  They were the parents of a son, Harold (1879–1900).  Harold Pitkin died of tuberculosis, and Clarence Pitkin's obituaries indicated that his son's death contributed to his own declining health.

References

Sources

Newspapers

Books

Internet

1849 births
1901 deaths
People from Montpelier, Vermont
Vermont Republicans
Vermont lawyers
State's attorneys in Vermont
United States Attorneys for the District of Vermont
Burials at Green Mount Cemetery (Montpelier, Vermont)